The Rosedale Gardens Historic District (locally known as Old Rosedale Gardens) is a historic district located on eight streets, from Arden Street to Hubbard Street, between Plymouth Road and West Chicago Street in Livonia, Michigan.  The district was placed on the National Register of Historic Places in 2010.

History
Rosedale Gardens was platted by the Shelden Land Company in the 1920s.  The company modeled the development on Rosedale Park in Detroit. The first house in Rosedale Gardens was the Harsha house, built in 1925; the house was occupied in January 1926.  These houses were wood structures. A total of 61 houses were built in 1926, and by 1929, 121 homes had been constructed. In addition, a small grocery opened in 1926, a school in 1927, and Rosedale Gardens Presbyterian Church in 1928.

When the Great Depression hit, construction stopped for a time; the developer bricked over existing homes, and continued with brick construction when building resumed later in the 1930s. About 250 homes were built in 1935–41, until World War II again intervened. Another housing boom occurred after the war, and by 1948 the original part of Rosedale Gardens contained 428 houses. Additional lots were platted, and homes built, through into the 1960s.

Description
The Rosedale Gardens Historic District is a residential neighborhood, encompassing approximately 40 acres, containing about 570 houses, primarily built between 1925 and 1960. Houses are located along eight parallel streets running north–south. The streets are narrow and without curves and are lined with a collection of mature trees. Lots lining the streets are 40 feet wide and run 120 to 145 feet deep. Houses tend to be relatively modest in size, typically in the range of 1000 to 2000 square feet and one or two stories.

The neighborhood is distinctive because, unlike nearly all of the surrounding neighborhoods, pre-World War II houses predominate, with 428 of the 570 total built before the war. Many of the oldest houses are wooden, although brick-faced houses predominate in the neighborhood. Architectural styles are typically Colonials and English cottages, with some newer ranch houses intermingled.

References

External links
Old Rosedale Gardens
Rosedale Gardens Presbyterian Church

Houses on the National Register of Historic Places in Michigan
Livonia, Michigan
Historic districts in Wayne County, Michigan
Houses in Wayne County, Michigan
Historic districts on the National Register of Historic Places in Michigan
National Register of Historic Places in Wayne County, Michigan